is an arcade game released in 1990 by SNK for the Neo Geo console and arcade systems. The players controls characters with red and blue hair and can select balls from 8 to 15 pounds. It is the only bowling game released on the Neo Geo.

Modes

League Bowling has three types of modes, played up to 4 players.

Regulation
Played just like a normal game of bowling, with 300 being a perfect score.

Flash
Values of 100 to 300 will flash on a randomizer during the time the bowler throws his shot.  A strike adds the bonus flash value to the score accumulated at the end of the game.  Below each strike value is a smaller point value, which is added to the score for a spare.

Unlike regular bowling, bonus shots in the tenth frame are not awarded; once a strike or spare is thrown, the game ends.

The maximum possible score is 3,000.

Strike 90
Played just like regulation except that a strike scores 90 points for the frame, and a spare scores 60 for the frame, with no carry-over bonus.  30 points are awarded in the case of a field goal (throwing the ball in between the 7 and 10 pins).  Like the Flash mode, there are no bonus shots in the tenth frame.

The maximum possible score is 900.

Multi Link Play
In addition, it also has the option to link up to 4 Neo-Geo MVS machines to become the 8-player game. This is the only Neo-Geo game that features the 8-player support. The 8-player gameplay video are shown on YouTube with the link below.

Reception 

In Japan, Game Machine listed League Bowling on their February 1, 1991 issue as being the eighth most-popular arcade game at the time. Likewise, RePlay reported the game to be the twentieth most-popular arcade game at the time. The title was met with mixed to positive reviews from critics, many of which criticized its awkward controls for being passable but praised its humorous artstyle as well as the characters and their reactions.

AllGames Kyle Knight praised the catoon-style presentation, simple gameplay and multiplayer but criticized the audio and lack of replay value. Consoles Pluss J.B. Aerstut also commended the visual presentation, comparing it with the works of Tex Avery, audio and playability but felt mixed in regards to its longevity. Hobby Consolas Manuel del Campo gave positive remarks to the multiplayer, character animations, appropriate music, sound and playability but criticized one gameplay aspect. Joysticks Jean-Marc Demoly and Player Ones Cyril Drevet commented positively in regards to the animated audiovisual presentation, realism and longevity. Joystick also regarded it as one of the best bowling simulators in the genre but was criticized for being repetitive and limited.

Ports
Tom Fulp, the founder and CEO of Newgrounds, ported the game to Flash in 2002. The port features no ball selection, a regulation mode only, fewer animations, and the different player's sprites are the same.

Later on 2010, SNK Playmore releases the NEOGEO Station, which includes the emulation of the game and other Neo-Geo games for the PlayStation 3 and the PSP.

On July 12, 2011, Virtual Console version for the Wii was released in Japan.

Easter Egg
Nadia, from the anime Nadia: The Secret of Blue Water, can be seen cheering in the background.

Amusements Arcade UK: Butlin's Minehead list 
Butlins (1994–2001) (Neo Geo MVS: Neo-Fruito-MVS – 5 Slot: Art of Fighting (1992), Samurai Shodown (1993), Mutation Nation (1992), League Bowling (1990) and Super Sidekicks (1992))

Notes

References

External links 
 League Bowling at GameFAQs
 League Bowling at Giant Bomb
 League Bowling at Killer List of Videogames
 League Bowling at MobyGames
 Play League Bowling online at Newgrounds
 League Bowling 8-Player Gameplay by Turfmasta on YouTube

1990 video games
ACA Neo Geo games
Arcade video games
Bowling video games
D4 Enterprise games
Multiplayer and single-player video games
Neo Geo games
Neo Geo CD games
Nintendo Switch games
PlayStation Network games
PlayStation 4 games
SNK Playmore games
SNK games
Virtual Console games
Video games developed in Japan
Xbox One games
Hamster Corporation games